Leonardo Manco (born 16 December 1971) is an Argentine comic book artist.

Career
Manco is best known for  his dark and gritty style on such titles as Marvel Comics’  Hellstorm (1994), Blaze of Glory (2000, #1-4), Apache Skies (2002, #1-4), Deathlok Vol. 3 (1999–2000), and Hellblazer (2004) from DC Comics’ Vertigo imprint.

Other work by Manco has included Marvel’s Archangel #1 (1996), Werewolf by Night Vol.2 #1-6 (1998), Doom #1-3 (2000) and Doom: The Emperor Returns #1-3 (2002). 

In 2004 he drew an original graphic novel Hellblazer: All His Engines, written by Mike Carey, and was the regular artist on the Hellblazer ongoing series for Vertigo. In June 2004 Manco was signed to a two-year exclusive contract with DC Comics.

Manco also contributed to the War Machine series from Marvel Comics.

Bibliography

DC Comics
Hellblazer #194-195, 200-205, 207-228, 230-237, 239-242, 247-249 (2004-08)
John Constantine, Hellblazer: All His Engines (graphic novel, 2005)
Wacky Raceland #1-6 (2016–17)

Marvel
 Hellstorm: Prince of Lies #8, 12-13, 15-16, 18-21 (1994)
 Druid, miniseries, #1-4 (1995)
 Wolverine Annual '97 (1997)
 Werewolf By Night Vol.2 #1-6 (1998)
 The Avengers '99 Annual (1999)
 Dr. Doom #1-3 (2000)
 War Machine #1-5 (2009)

Boom! Entertainment
28 Days Later #9 (2010)
Clive Barker's Hellraiser: Pursuit of the Flesh Prelude + Chapters 1-2 (2012)

Collected Comics
Hellblazer (DC Comics):
 Stations of the Cross (with Mike Carey, collects #194–195 and 200)
 Reasons to be Cheerful (with Mike Carey, collects #201-205)
 The Gift (with Mike Carey, collects #207-212, September 2007)
All His Engines (with Mike Carey, graphic novel, Vertigo, 2005, paperback, hardcover)
 Empathy is the Enemy (with Denise Mina, collects #214–222) 
 The Red Right Hand (with Denise Mina, collects #224–228) 
Joyride (with Andy Diggle, 192 pages, Vertigo, February 2008, Titan, April 2008) collects:
 "In at the Deep End" (Hellblazer #230-231, 2007)
 "Wheels of Chance, Systems of Control" (Hellblazer #232-233, 2007)
 "Joyride" (Hellblazer #234-237, 2007)
 The Laughing Magician (with Andy Diggle, 128 pages, August 2008) collects:
 "The Passage" (Hellblazer #239, 2007)
 "The Laughing Magician" (Hellblazer #240-242, 2008)

2000 AD
 Judge Dredd: "A Better Class of Criminal" (with Rory McConville, 2000 AD #2091–2094, 2018)
 Sláine: "Dragontamer" (with Pat Mills, 2000 AD #2212–ongoing, 2020–2021)

References

External links

Leonardo Manco at Marvel.com
Leonardo Manco at the Unofficial Handbook of Marvel Comics Creators

1971 births
Living people
Argentine comics artists
American Splendor artists
Marvel Comics people